The 2020 Maryland Terrapins men's soccer team represents the University of Maryland, College Park during the 2020 NCAA Division I men's soccer season. It is the 75th season of the university fielding a program. The Terrapins are led by 28th year head coach, Sasho Cirovski.

Effects of the Covid-19 pandemic 
On August 11, 2020, the Big Ten Conference postponed all fall sports, with the hope to play in the spring.

On November 4, 2020, the NCAA approved a plan for college soccer to be played in the spring.

Roster 
Source:

Schedule

Regular season

Postseason

Big Ten Tournament

NCAA Tournament

References

2020
Maryland Terrapins
Maryland Terrapins
Maryland Terrapins men's soccer
Maryland